The Mexican Dream, Or, The Interrupted Thought of Amerindian Civilizations is an English translation of an essay written in French by J. M. G. Le Clézio first published in 1988.

Contents
Le rêve du Conquérant (The Dream of the Conquerors)
 Moctezuma, Huitzilopochtli, Mexico
Le rêve des origines (The Dream of Origins)
 Quetzalcoatl, Huitzilopochtli, Aztèques
Mythes mexicains (Mexican Myths)
 Nahuatl, Huicholes, Quetzalcoatl
Nezahualcoyotl, or the Festival of Words

The barbarian dream

Antonin Artaud, or the Mexican Dream

The interrupted thought of Amerindian Civilizations

Notes
Map of region

Subjects
 History: Latin American History
 Latin American Studies
 Literature and Literary Criticism: Romance Languages
 Religion: Comparative Studies and History of Religion

Aim 
In the essay, Le Clézio conducts an inquiry into the brutal disappearance of the indigenous cultures of Mesoamerica in the 16th century, particularly the end of the Mexican civilization at the hands of the Spanish conquistadors.
The author analyses the personalities of characters such as Hernán Cortés, La Malinche, Moctezuma II, Cuauhtémoc, and other key players in the conquest of Mesoamerica. He refers extensively to the descriptions offered by Bernal Díaz del Castillo in his  Historia verdadera de la conquista de la Nueva España in analysing the events. He imagines what might have happened if the native populations had not been reduced to silence by brutality, and what their impact on Western civilization might have been. Understanding that the West holds both economic and cultural sway over the contemporary world because of the colonization of America, he wonders how the cultural life of Mesoamerica – particularly that of the Aztecs – would have evolved if the arrival of the Europeans had not decimated the indigenous societies through war, disease and slavery.

Publication history/Editions

11 editions published between 1988 and 2004 in 5 languages and held by 835 libraries worldwide.

First French Edition

second French Edition

other French Edition
Also published in French under

First English Edition

Second English Edition

Reviews
Le Figaro and Kirkus Reviews reviewed the book.

The University of Chicago Press

References

External links
 

1965 essays
Essays by J. M. G. Le Clézio
Mesoamerican studies books
University of Chicago Press books
Works by J. M. G. Le Clézio